The 1969 Cincinnati Reds season was a season in American baseball. It consisted of the Reds finishing in third place in the newly established National League West Division, four games behind the National League West Division champion Atlanta Braves. The Reds were managed by Dave Bristol, and played their home games at Crosley Field, which was in its final full season of operation, before moving into their new facility in the middle of the following season. The Reds led the major leagues this year with 798 runs scored.

Offseason 

 October 14, 1968: Jimy Williams was drafted from the Reds by the Montreal Expos as the 32nd pick in the 1968 MLB expansion draft.
 December 5, 1968: Don Pavletich and Don Secrist were traded by the Reds to the Chicago White Sox for Jack Fisher.
 March 18, 1969: Bill Kelso was purchased from the Reds by the Boston Red Sox.
 March 29, 1969: Bill Kelso was returned to the Reds by the Boston Red Sox.

Divisional alignment 
1969 not only marked the 100th anniversary of the original Cincinnati Red Stockings being the first fully professional baseball team, but it also marked the first year of divisional play in Major League Baseball. The Reds (along with the Atlanta Braves) were placed in the National League West division, despite being located further east than the two westernmost teams in the NL East division, the Chicago Cubs and St. Louis Cardinals. This was because the New York Mets wanted to be in the same division as the reigning power in the NL, which were the Cardinals at the time (to compensate for playing against the Dodgers and Giants fewer times each season). The Cubs consequently demanded to be in the NL East as well in order to continue playing in the same division as the Cardinals, one of the Cubs' biggest rivals. A side effect of this alignment is that it set the stage for what is considered one of the greatest pennant races – and comebacks in such a race – in MLB history (see 1969 New York Mets season for more info).

Regular season

Season standings

Record vs. opponents

Notable transactions 
 June 5, 1969: 1969 Major League Baseball Draft
Nardi Contreras was drafted by the Reds in the 12th round.
Ken Griffey, Sr. was drafted by the Reds in the 29th round.
 June 13, 1969: Al Jackson was purchased by the Reds from the New York Mets.
 June 14, 1969: Aurelio Monteagudo was traded by the Reds to the St. Louis Cardinals for Dennis Ribant.

Roster

Player stats

Batting

Starters by position 
Note: Pos = Position; G = Games played; AB = At bats; H = Hits; Avg. = Batting average; HR = Home runs; RBI = Runs batted in

Other batters 
Note: G = Games played; AB = At bats; H = Hits; Avg. = Batting average; HR = Home runs; RBI = Runs batted in

Pitching

Starting pitchers 
Note: G = Games pitched; IP = Innings pitched; W = Wins; L = Losses; ERA = Earned run average; SO = Strikeouts

Other pitchers 
Note: G = Games pitched; IP = Innings pitched; W = Wins; L = Losses; ERA = Earned run average; SO = Strikeouts

Relief pitchers 
Note: G = Games pitched; W = Wins; L = Losses; SV = Saves; ERA = Earned run average; SO = Strikeouts

Awards and honors 
 Pete Rose, National League batting champion
 Pete Rose, Lou Gehrig Award
 Johnny Bench, Marathon Oil Cincinnati Reds Player of the Year

Farm system

Notes

References 
1969 Cincinnati Reds season at Baseball Reference

Cincinnati Reds seasons
Cincinnati Reds season
Cincinnati Reds